Mocan may refer to:

 Mocán, a medieval Irish saint
 Mocan (surname)

See also
 
 Mocanu, a surname